The following highways are numbered 871:

United States